Music Madness is the second album by old school hip hop and electro funk group Mantronix.  Music Madness was the final Mantronix album released on the independent Sleeping Bag Records label. The hip hop album features club-oriented production by Kurtis Mantronik and MC Tee's b-boy-based rapping.

Critical reception 
In a contemporary review for The Village Voice, music critic Robert Christgau gave the album a B-minus and found Kurtis Mantronik's beats to be full of "groove, variety, and (damn right) human touch", but facetiously pitied M.C. Tee for needing "boasting lessons." In a retrospective review, Allmusic's Alex Henderson gave it four-and-a-half out of five stars and viewed it as both Mantronix's second best album behind The Album and "proof of how fresh-sounding and creative Mantronix was in the beginning."

Track listing
 "Who Is It?" (MC Tee, Mantronik) – 6:05
 "We Control the Dice" (MC Tee, Mantronik) – 3:53
 "Listen to the Bass of Get Stupid Fresh Part 2" (MC Tee, Mantronik) – 4:22
 "Ladies UK Remix" (MC Tee, Mantronik) – 3:35
 "Big Band B-Boy" (MC Tee, Mantronik) – 4:40
 "Music Madness" (MC Tee, Mantronik) – 5:23
 "Electronic Energy Of..." (MC Tee, Mantronik) – 5:29
 "Scream" (MC Tee, Mantronik) – 5:23
 "Mega Mix" (MC Tee, Mantronik) – 4:00

Bonus tracks
In 1987, Sleeping Bag Records released the album on compact disc with the name Music Madness Plus, which included five bonus tracks from The Album.
 "Bassline" (MC Tee, Mantronik) – 5:23
 "Needle to the Groove" (MC Tee, Mantronik) – 3:40
 "Hardcore Hip-Hop" (MC Tee, Mantronik) – 6:20
 "Get Stupid 'Fresh' Pt. 1" (MC Tee, Mantronik) – 3:53
 "Fresh is the Word" (MC Tee, Mantronik) – 5:28

Charts
Billboard Music Charts (North America) - album

Billboard (North America) - singles

References

External links
 

1986 albums
Mantronix albums
Sleeping Bag Records albums
Albums produced by Kurtis Mantronik